The Saiō Matsuri (斎王まつり) is a 2-day festival held on the first weekend of June in the town of Meiwa, Mie Prefecture in Japan. The Saiō Matsuri celebrates the town's history of once being an Imperial residence. The festival re-enacts the march of the Saiō and her entourage to the nearby Ise Shrine.

See also 
 Aoi Matsuri in Kyoto

References
Saio Matsuri (Japanese)

Festivals in Mie Prefecture
Festivals in Japan
Holidays and observances by scheduling (nth weekday of the month)
June observances
Saigū